Sairandhri is the pseudonym assumed by Draupadi during her incognito. It may refer to:

 Sairandhri (1920 film), an Indian Hindi-language film
 Sairandhri (1933 film), an Indian Marathi and Hindi-language film
 The primary entrance location of Silent Valley National Park in Kerala, India